The Seguin Huskies are a Canadian Junior ice hockey team based in Humphrey, Ontario, Canada.  They play in the Greater Metro Junior A Hockey League (GMHL).

History
The Seguin Huskies joined the GMHL in spring 2013. The Huskies are the first junior team in Humphrey since the Seguin Bruins of the Ontario Junior Hockey League folded in 2010.

On September 14, 2013, the Huskies played their first game as a franchise, traveling to Bracebridge, Ontario, to play the second year Bracebridge Phantoms. At 3:46 into the first period, Connor Scott scored the first goal in franchise history.  Tanner Emerson made 28 saves to earn the team's first victory, a 15–3 romp of the Phantoms. On September 15, 2013, the Huskies played their first home game.  They hosted and defeated the Phantoms 10–4.  Kevin Munge scored the first home goal in team history along with totaling three goals and two assists on the night, while Tanner Emerson picked up the win with 36 saves. The Huskies finished their inaugural season 39–1–2.

In 2017, the team owners merged one of their other teams, the Parry Sound Islanders, into the Huskies for the 2017–18 season. The owners also made the Islanders' head coach Doug Raymond the new Huskies head coach. The next season, the Huskies were no longer listed as members of the GMHL.

Season-by-season standings

References

External links
Huskies Webpage
GMHL Webpage

2013 establishments in Ontario
Ice hockey clubs established in 2013
Ice hockey teams in Ontario
Parry Sound District